The Recorder of Nottingham is the highest appointed legal officer of the Crown within the Nottingham City and Nottinghamshire County areas of England.

Judge Gregory Dickinson KC was appointed Recorder of Nottingham in 2016.

List of Recorders of Nottingham
 
Sir Thomas Babington 1492 - 1519
Radus Barton
Richard Parkyns
Henry Pierrepont appointed 1603
Wills Fletcher
John Holles, 2nd Earl of Clare appointed 1642
Henry Pierrepont, 1st Marquess of Dorchester 1666 - (d. 1680)
Henry Cavendish, 2nd Duke of Newcastle-upon-Tyne 1688 - 
William Cavendish, 1st Duke of Devonshire 1690 - (d. 1707)
Evelyn Pierrepont, 1st Duke of Kingston-upon-Hull - 1726
Thomas Pelham-Holles, 1st Duke of Newcastle-upon-Tyne 1726 - 
Edward Bigland
William Bentinck, 2nd Duke of Portland
Evelyn Pierrepont, 2nd Duke of Kingston-upon-Hull 1769 -
Henry Pelham-Clinton, 2nd Duke of Newcastle-under-Lyne 1773-1794
William Cavendish-Bentinck, 3rd Duke of Portland 1794–1809
Henry Richard Vassall Fox, 3rd Lord Holland (died 1840)
Richard Wildman 1837 - 1881
Edward Chandos Leigh 1881 - 1909
Judge Henry Yorke Stanger 1909 - 1911
Sir William Ryland Dent Adkins 1911 - 1920
Hugo J. Young 1920 - 1927
Henry Holmes Joy 1927 - 1934
John Frederick Eales 1934 - 1936
Sir Albion Richardson 1936 - 1950
Christopher Nyholm Shawcross 1950 - 1961
Anthony Leonard Cripps 1961 - 1971
Arthur Ellis 1974 -1991 
Judge Michael Stokes QC 2007 - 2016
Judge Gregory Dickinson QC 2016 -

References

Politics of Nottinghamshire
English law
Region-specific legal occupations
Nottingham